Annutteliga Hammock is a  park and preserve in Weeki Wachee, Florida, Hernando County, Florida's the Brooksville Ridge and protects groundwater recharge. It connects with the Chassahowitzka Wildlife Management Area and offers trails for hiking and horseback riding. It is located at 11019 Centralia Road.

References

Parks in Hernando County, Florida
Southwest Florida Water Management District reserves